Forrest Sale "Red" DeBernardi (February 3, 1899 – April 29, 1970) was an American college basketball player in the 1920s. Standing 6 ft. 1 inches tall, DeBernardi was one of the best centers of his era, and played all five positions. Born in Nevada, Missouri, he attended Westminster College where he played from 1919 to 1921. On January 19, 1920, he made 24 field goals against Missouri Wesleyan, a school record that stands to this day. DeBernardi then transferred to the University of Kansas in order to be closer to the Kansas City Athletic Club so that he could compete for them in the Amateur Athletic Union (AAU). He did not play for the university, however.

Following his impressive collegiate career, DeBernardi became an outstanding AAU player. Between 1920 and 1929, when he played with Kansas City Athletic Club (1920–22), Hillyard Shine Alls (1922–27) and Cook's Painter Boys (1927–29), he played in 10 national AAU tournaments and was named to the AAU All-American team five times. DeBernardi was also an AAU national champion five times.

In 1938 the Associated Press selected DeBernardi as the center on its All-Time All America college basketball team. He was also awarded with the Helms Athletic Foundation Hall of Fame Award in 1952. In 1961, DeBernardi was elected to the Basketball Hall of Fame. In 2006, he was elected posthumously into the National Collegiate Basketball Hall of Fame.

References
 HOF BB Players – Forrest DeBernardi
 Westminster College Hall of Fame – Forrest DeBernardi

1899 births
1970 deaths
All-American college men's basketball players
Amateur Athletic Union men's basketball players
American men's basketball players
Basketball players from Kansas
Basketball players from Missouri
Centers (basketball)
College men's tennis players in the United States
College men's track and field athletes in the United States
Naismith Memorial Basketball Hall of Fame inductees
National Collegiate Basketball Hall of Fame inductees
People from Nevada, Missouri
University of Kansas alumni
Westminster Blue Jays baseball players
Westminster Blue Jays men's basketball players